Greifensee is a lake in the canton of Zürich in Switzerland.

Geography 

The Aabach (Greifensee) (or just Aa) is the main supplying river, while its outlet is the Glatt. On its southeastern end the Mönchaltorfer Aa (or just Aa) enters the Greifensee.

Points of interest 

A boat connects small towns along the edge of the lake, Maur, Niederuster, Fällanden, Mönchaltorf and the town Greifensee with its charming Altstadt and Greifensee castle.

Greifensee is the scene of the Greifensee-Lauf, a semi-marathon around the lake held every year.

Greifensee is a popular recreation area for biking and inline skating on the paved recreation path around the lake. Easy hiking trails follow the water and pass Greifensee castle before entering a nature preserve. There are well maintained bicycle roads all around the lake as well as on the banks of Aabach.

Nature 
The lakeside is under UNESCO protection, and buildings are not allowed, resulting in reed bed and a rich fauna and flora: Around 400 plant species in the lake and 19 species in its tributaries. The nature reserves are important for the birds breeding there including more than 120 migratory species.

Cultural Heritage 
The lake was known as Glattsee (after the Glatt) in the medieval period Greifensee (Grifense) was at first the name of the fort built by the counts of Rapperswil in the 12th century, recorded as the name of the bailiwick in 1260. 
This was adopted as the name of the lake by the 16th century.

Located on the  lakeshore, the Prehistoric pile dwelling settlement Greifensee–Storen–Wildsberg is part of the 56 Swiss sites of the UNESCO World Heritage Site Prehistoric pile dwellings around the Alps, and the settlement is also listed in the Swiss inventory of cultural property of national and regional significance as a Class object.

See also
List of lakes of Switzerland

References

External links 

 
 Schifffahrts-Genossenschaft Greifensee: Boat schedules 
 Waterlevels at Greifensee

Lakes of Switzerland
Lakes of the canton of Zürich
LGreifensee